Mount Aeolus is a mountain summit in Dorset, Bennington County, Vermont, United States. Mount Aeolus is one of the Taconic Mountains.

Name
Its name is derived from Aeolus, the Greek god of the wind. The Board on Geographic Names ruled in favor of the current name in 1986; prior to that time, the mountain had been referred to as "Mount Eolus" and "Green Peak".

References

Mountains of Vermont
Mountains of Bennington County, Vermont